German submarine U-328 was a Type VIIC/41 U-boat of Nazi Germany's Kriegsmarine during World War II.

She carried out no patrols and sank or damaged no ships.

The boat surrendered in Norway on 9 May 1945 and was sunk as part of Operation Deadlight on 30 November 1945.

Design
Like all Type VIIC/41 U-boats, U-328 had a displacement of  when at the surface and  while submerged.

U-328 was fitted with five  torpedo tubes (four fitted at the bow and one at the stern), fourteen torpedoes, one  SK C/35 naval gun, (220 rounds), one  Flak M42 and two  C/30 anti-aircraft guns. Its complement was between forty-four and sixty.

Service history
The submarine was laid down on 15 May 1943 by the Flender Werke yard at Lübeck as yard number 328, launched on 24 June 1944 and commissioned on 19 September under the command of Oberleutnant zur See Peter Lawrence.

She served with the 4th U-boat Flotilla for training, from 19 September 1944 to 1 May 1945 and the 11th flotilla 2 – 8 May 1945. The boat surrendered at Bergen in Norway on 9 May 1945. She was transferred to Loch Ryan in Scotland on the 30th for Operation Deadlight. She was sunk by aircraft of the Fleet Air Arm on 30 November.

See also
 Battle of the Atlantic (1939-1945)

References

Bibliography

External links

German Type VIIC/41 submarines
U-boats commissioned in 1944
1944 ships
World War II submarines of Germany
Ships built in Lübeck
Operation Deadlight
U-boats sunk in 1945
U-boats sunk by British aircraft
Maritime incidents in May 1945
Maritime incidents in November 1945